Mehraban (also Romanized as Mehrabān; also known as Mehravān and Mehrevān) is a city in Mehraban District of Sarab County, East Azerbaijan province, Iran. At the 2006 census, its population was 6,000 in 1,542 households. The following census in 2011 counted 6,095 people in 1,728 households. The latest census in 2016 showed a population of 5,772 people in 1,882 households.

References 

Sarab County

Cities in East Azerbaijan Province

Populated places in East Azerbaijan Province

Populated places in Sarab County